In the game of chess, an endgame study, or just study, is a composed position—that is, one that has been made up rather than played in an actual game—presented as a sort of puzzle, in which the aim of the solver is to find the essentially unique way for one side (usually White) to win or draw, as stipulated, against any moves the other side plays. If the study does not end in a mate or stalemate, it should be obvious that the game is either won or drawn, and White can have a selection of many different moves. There is no limit to the number of moves which are allowed to achieve the win; this distinguishes studies from the genre of direct mate problems (e.g. "mate in 2"). Such problems also differ qualitatively from the very common genre of tactical puzzles based around the middlegame, often based on an actual game, where a decisive tactic must be found.

Composed studies
Composed studies predate the modern form of chess. Shatranj studies exist in manuscripts from the 9th century, and the earliest treatises on modern chess by the likes of Luis Ramirez Lucena and Pedro Damiano (late 15th and early 16th century) also include studies. However, these studies often include superfluous pieces, added to make the position look more "game-like", but which take no part in the actual solution (something that is never done in the modern study). Various names were given to these positions (Damiano, for example, called them "subtleties"); the first book which called them "studies" appears to be Chess Studies, an 1851 publication by Josef Kling and Bernhard Horwitz, which is sometimes also regarded as the starting point for the modern endgame study. The form is considered to have been raised to an art in the late 19th century, with A. A. Troitsky and Henri Rinck particularly important in this respect.

Most composers, including Troitsky, Rinck, and other famous figures such as Genrikh Kasparyan, are known primarily for their studies, being little known as players. However, some famous players have also composed endgame studies, with Emanuel Lasker, Richard Réti, Vasily Smyslov, and Jan Timman being perhaps the most notable ones.

Examples

Richard Réti's study is one of the most famous of all time. It is White to play and draw. At first sight, this seems an impossible task: if White tries to chase after Black's pawn he can never catch it (1.Kh7 h4 2.Kh6 h3 etc. is clearly hopeless), while it is clear that Black will simply take White's pawn if he tries to promote it.

White can draw, however, by taking advantage of the fact that the king can move towards both pawns at once. The solution is 1. Kg7 h4 (1...Kb6 2. Kf6! h4 3.Ke5! transposes) 2. Kf6! Kb6 (if 2...h3, then 3.Ke6 h2 4.c7 Kb7 5.Kd7 allows white to promote his pawn) 3. Ke5! Now, if 3...Kxc6, then 4.Kf4 stops Black's pawn after all, while if 3...h3 4.Kd6 allows White to promote his pawn. Either way, the result is a draw.  (Also see King and pawn versus king endgame, the section Rule of the square.)

Not all studies are as simple as the above Réti example. This study (first diagram) is by Genrikh Kasparyan (first published in Magyar Sakkélet, 1962). White is to play and draw. The main line of the solution is 1. Ra1 a2 2. Ke6 Ba3 3. Bf4 Bb2 4. Be5 a3 5. Kd5 Bg6 6. Bd4 Bf7+ 7. Ke4 Bc4 8. Rg1, but there are various alternatives for both sides. For example, White could try 1.Bf4 on his first move, with the idea 1...Bxa2 2.Bxd6 and 3.Bxa3 is a draw, but Black can defeat this idea with 1...Bxf4 2.Rxa3 Bc2, which wins. To understand why one move works and another one does not, requires quite advanced chess knowledge. Indeed, it will not be obvious to many players that the position at the end of the given line (second diagram) is a draw at all.

One of the most notable studies is Leopold Mitrofanov's 1967 first-prize winner.

Solution: 1. b6+ Ka8 2. Re1! Nxe1 3. g7 h1=Q (if 3...Nc4+ then 4.Kb5 h1=Q 5.g8=Q+ Bb8 6.a7 Na3+ 7.Kc6 Qh2 8.axb8=Q+ Qxb8 9.b7+ Ka7 10.Qg1+ Ka6 11.Qb6 mate) 4. g8=Q+ Bb8 5. a7 Nc6+ 6. dxc6 Qxh5+ 7. Qg5 (not 7.Ka6 Qe2+ or 7.Kb4? Qh4+ with perpetual check) Qxg5+ 8. Ka6 (the queen is deflected from the white diagonal where she could give check) 8... Bxa7 (or 8...Qb5+ 9.Kxb5 Nc2 10.c7 and wins) 9. c7! (a silent move; the double threat c8=Q+ and b7 mate forces Black to sacrifice the queen) 9... Qa5+ 10. Kxa5 Kb7 11. bxa7 and White wins.

Early example

Most old shatranj studies are not valid in modern chess because of changed rules. However, the moves of the king, rook, and knight are unchanged.  In this Arabic study White wins because the black knight is poorly placed. With White to move the best move is 1. Rd1, but it is not the only winning move. If Black is to move, 1... Kb8! 2. Kc6! Na5+! 3. Kb6! Nc4+ 4. Kb5! Ne5 5. Re1! Nd7 6. Kc6! wins.

Studies and special moves
The special moves or rules of chess, such as castling, underpromotion, double-square pawn advance, and en passant are commonly a key feature of studies, as are sacrifices.

Castling

Castling in the endgame occurs seldom and is more often seen in studies. Here is one example where White wins by privilege of castling rights.

: 1.0-0-0? Ra2! 2.d7 Ra1+ 3.Kc2 Rxd1 4.Kxd1 Kc7 drawn.

White needs: 1. d7! Kc7 2. d8=Q+! Kxd8 3. 0-0-0+ simultaneously attacking the king and rook that is captured next move.

Study engineering 

With the creation and popularization of chess-playing computer software programs, a number of which have achieved Elo ratings higher than top human players, many composers collaborate with them both in composing and solving compositions. Though proven to be helpful, positions have been found which cause even the strongest engines to incorrectly evaluate the outcome. Chess master Frédéric Lazard's 1946 composition is White to play and draw. As of early 2021, top chess engines such as Stockfish evaluate the position as clearly won for Black.

Solution: 1. Ne4+ Kh4 (1...dxe4 2.Be1#) 2. Ng3! Qf8 (2...fxg3 3.Bb6) 3. Be1 fxg3 4. Bf2! d4 (4...Qxf2 stalemate, 4...gxf2 5.g3+ Kh3 stalemate) 5. Bxd4 c5 6. Bxc5 Qf1+ 7. Bg1 Qf2 8. Bxf2 gxf2 9. g3+ Kxg3 drawn.

See also
 List of chess endgame study composers
 Saavedra position

References

Further reading

John Beasley and Timothy Whitworth, Endgame Magic (Batsford, 1996), an introduction to the subject
A. J. Roycroft, Test Tube Chess (Faber, 1972), a general overview of studies, including 433 examples
Flemish miniatures. 123 chess endgame studies, composed, compiled and published by Ignace Vandecasteele, Julien Vandiest and Roger Missiaen, 1998, ARVES ‘book of the year’ 1997, .  The best studies of the three musketeers of the Flemish endgame community.
360 Brilliant and Instructive End Games, by A. A. Troitzky, 1968, Dover Pubns. . A collection of 360 endgame studies by Troitsky.
One Pawn Saves the Day: A World Champion's Favorite Studies, by Sergei Tkachenko, 2017, Limited Liability Company Elk and Ruby Publishing House . 100 studies whose common theme is that white ends up with just one pawn in the finale, yet manages to win or draw.
One Knight Saves the Day: A World Champion's Favorite Studies, by Sergei Tkachenko, 2017, Limited Liability Company Elk and Ruby Publishing House . 100 studies whose common theme is that white ends up with just one knight in the finale, yet manages to win or draw.
One Bishop Saves the Day: A World Champion's Favorite Studies, by Sergei Tkachenko, 2017, Limited Liability Company Elk and Ruby Publishing House . 100 studies whose common theme is that white ends up with just one bishop in the finale, yet manages to win or draw.
One Rook Saves the Day: A World Champion's Favorite Studies, by Sergei Tkachenko, 2017, Limited Liability Company Elk and Ruby Publishing House . 100 studies whose common theme is that white ends up with just one rook in the finale, yet manages to win or draw.

External links
 ARVES biographical data on composers
 Handbook of Chess Composition

Chess endgames
Chess problems